Chaloem Buri is the area south of the intersection of Yaowarat and Songsawat Roads in Bangkok's Samphanthawong District. 

Chaloem Buri is considered as the second intersection of Yaowarat from Odeon Circle nearby. Its name comes from the name of a cinema, it was in the area on Songsawat Road. Originally, the cinema was named "Singapore"  before it was demolished and rebuilt in 1932 along with the Sala Chalermkrung Royal Theatre in the occasion of 150th anniversary celebration of Rattanakosin (Bangkok) and renamed "Chaloem Buri". The present location of Chaloem Buri become a parking lot of the Songsawat Road.

Nowadays, the area around Chaloem Buri is home to many hotels including several restaurants with travel agency. At nighttime, there're also many street food stalls such as rad na, rice noodle roll and popia, yam, or pathongko etc. They're very popular with tourists. In addition in the past, Chaloem Buri was also the location of the first pork satay restaurant in Thailand.

See also
Bangkok's Chinatown

References 

Road junctions in Bangkok
Samphanthawong district